Promode Mankin  Sangma (18 July 1939 – 11 May 2016) was a Bangladesh Awami League politician and State Minister of Social Welfare Affairs. He was the first Catholic and first member of the country's Christian community to become a government minister in Bangladesh. Later, his son, Jewel Areng, was elected MP after his father's death in his constituency.

Early life and career
Mankin was born on 18 July 1939 at Ramnagar village in Bakalijora Union, Durgapur Upazila, Netrokona to Megha Tozu and Hridoy Cecelia Mankin. He joined Awami League in 1991. He was the President of Bangladesh Christian Association. He was elected Member of Parliament from Mymensingh-1 four times. He was a member of the Garo community. He fought in the Bangladesh liberation war.

Personal life and death
On 29 January 1964, Mankin married Momota Areng. They had five daughters and one son. He died on 11 May 2016 at Holy Family Hospital in Mumbai, India.

References

1939 births
2016 deaths
Bangladeshi Christians
People from Netrokona District
Awami League politicians
State Ministers of Social Welfare
8th Jatiya Sangsad members
Notre Dame College, Dhaka alumni
9th Jatiya Sangsad members
10th Jatiya Sangsad members
State Ministers of Cultural Affairs (Bangladesh)
Garo people